Didia may refer to:
 Didia, High Priest of Ptah during the reign of Ramesses II
 Didia (moth), a genus of moth
 Didia, Liberia, a proposed port near Buchanan
 DiDia 150, Bobby Darin's "Dream Car"